Neji may refer to:

 Neji (horse), an American thoroughbred racehorse
 Neji, Iran, a village in Kurdistan Province, Iran
 Neji Hyuga, a character in the manga series Naruto
 Amagranoff Luozontam Ouv Lee Neji, a character in the manga series Blood Blockade Battlefront

People with the given name
 Neji Jouini (born 1949), former Tunisian football referee

See also
 Sorede Souzousuru Neji, an EP by the band Nisennenmondai